Espinasse is a commune in the Puy-de-Dôme department in Auvergne in central France.
Small farming village in the Pays of Combrailles, in the canton of Saint-Éloy-les-Mines, the village is nestled in a hollow, about nine kilometers west of the town of Saint-Gervais-d'Auvergne.
The inhabitants of the commune are known as Espinassois or Espinassoises.

During the Middle Ages and the Early modern period, the region of Combrailles was of paramount importance at territorial level because it was located at the crossroads of several lordships (Bourbonnais, Auvergne and Limousin). Therefore, the town of Espinasse suffered this proximity and was divided into fiefs belonging among others to the House of Le Loup, the House of Montmorency and the House of La Fayette.

Geography
Espinasse is located some 30 km west of Combronde and 23 km north-west of Bromont-Lamothe. Access to the commune is by the D 13 from Charensat in the south-west which passes through the commune and the village before continuing north to Pionsat. The D 62 comes from Saint-Priest-des-Champs in the south-east. The D 18 comes from Saint-Julien-la-Geneste in the north-east. The D 528 comes from Bussières in the north-west. The commune is mixed forest and farmland.

Neighbouring communes and villages

Administration

Demography
In 2017 the commune had 294 inhabitants.

Culture and heritage

Cultural events and festivities
The Hay Fest (La Fête des Foins in French) is the main festival in the village since 1998. It takes place in July.

Tourist monuments and places
The Church of St. Martin, very old, is partly Romanesque but was changed to the 2nd Gothic era. A statuary element painted white stone shows St. Margaret of Antioch slaying the dragon. It dates from the fifteenth century. Saint Martin is the patron of the parish but is also under the protection of Saint Gal, second patron.
The local school, completed in 1900, was also a town hall. The building was called Mairie-École at the time.
The Résistance site at Cacherat - Camp Gabriel Peri - which received on 23 October 1943, one of the two groups of escapees from the prison of Le Puy-en-Velay.
The Château of Pierrebrune, dating from the thirteenth century, rebuilt to modern, was the residence of the lords of Espinasse. In June 1440 during the Praguerie, King Charles VII, who came from Auzances and went to Montaigut-en-Combraille, passed through Pierrebrune.
The War Memorial in front of the church.

See also
Communes of the Puy-de-Dôme department

References

External links
Espinasse website 

Communes of Puy-de-Dôme